Mesrine is a 1984 French film written and directed by André Génovès. A biographical film based on the life of Jacques Mesrine, it focuses on the eighteen months following his escape from La Santé Prison in May 1978 until his death in November 1979. Nicolas Silberg stars as the eponymous lead character.

Cast 
 Nicolas Silberg as Jacques Mesrine
 Caroline Aguilar as Sylvia Jeanjacquot
 Gérard Sergue as François Besse
 Michel Poujade as Le commissaire Broussard
 Louis Arbessier as Lelievre
 Claude Faraldo as Charlie Bauer
 Jean-Pierre Pauty as Tillier
 Artus de Penguern as Inspector Lejeune

Reception 
Film critic James Benefield of Little White Lies magazine regarded Mesrine as "a pretty ropey, half-baked biopic", inferior to the later 2008 film starring Vincent Cassel. Benefield criticized Génovès' "bland direction" and "lack of imagination", likening the film to a television production rather than a cinematic release, and noted that "the film fails to come to terms with Mesrine’s controversial glamour and celebrity". The Blood wrote a song about Mesrine which preceded both the 1984, and 2008 movies. The song featured on the 1983 album False Gestures For A Devious Public.

References

External links 
 
 

1984 films
Biographical films about French gangsters
1984 crime drama films
French crime drama films
1980s French-language films
Films set in the 1970s
1980s French films